Richard Charles "Jake" McCullough (born July 23, 1965) is a former American football defensive end who played with the Denver Broncos of the NFL and the London Monarchs of the WLAF. He played college football at Clemson.

College football career 
McCullough played football for the Clemson Tigers from 1985 to 1988. With the Tigers, he played in the 1986 Gator Bowl and the 1988 and 1989 Citrus Bowl. He made second-team All-Atlantic Coast and honorable mention All-America by the Associated Press.

Professional career

Denver Broncos

1989 season 

McCullough was drafted by the Denver Broncos in the fourth round of the 1989 NFL Draft, with the 97th pick overall. He played in 10 games in the Broncos' 1989 season before suffering a hip injury and being placed on injured reserve on December 15. In his 10 games, he recorded two tackles and a sack.

The Broncos later went on to Super Bowl XXIV, but lost 55–10 against the San Francisco 49ers.

1990 season 

McCullough played six games with the team in 1990.

London Monarchs 
McCullough played with the London Monarchs of the World League of American Football in 1992.

References 

Living people
1965 births
African-American players of American football
American football defensive ends
Clemson Tigers football players
Denver Broncos players
London Monarchs players
People from Loris, South Carolina
Players of American football from South Carolina